These are the results for the 26th edition of the Ronde van Nederland cycling race, which was held from August 18 to August 23, 1986. The race started in Veenendaal (Gelderland) and finished in Gulpen (Limburg).

Stages

18-08-1986: Veenendaal-Veenendaal (Prologue), 4.8 km

19-08-1986: Veenendaal-Assen, 240 km

20-08-1986: Assen-Schagen, 238 km

21-08-1986: Schagen-Den Haag, 247 km

22-08-1986: Den Haag-Nijmegen, 152 km

22-08-1986: Groesbeek-Nijmegen (Time Trial), 14.6 km

23-08-1986: Sittard-Gulpen, 181 km

Final classification

External links
Wielersite Results

Ronde van Nederland
August 1986 sports events in Europe
1986 in road cycling
Ronde